The Gatornationals is an annual National Hot Rod Association (NHRA) national drag racing event held each March at Gainesville Raceway in Gainesville, Florida. The event was held for the first time in 1970.  The traditional East Coast opener and the season's first of 16 events for Pro Stock Motorcycle riders and first of 10 for NHRA Get Screened America Pro Mod Drag Racing Series racers moves back to the second spot on the calendar. The event is one of the sport's most revered with a rich tradition of history-making performances. The Gatornationals have the title of being the drag race to see the first 260-mph Top Fuel and Funny Car runs in 1984 by Joe Amato and Kenny Bernstein respectively, and the first 270-mph and 300-mph Top Fuel passes by Don Garlits and Kenny Bernstein in 1986 and 1992, respectively. Its 675-foot concrete launchpad is one of the longest on the tour. 

In 2014 the Amalie Motor Oil NHRA Gatornationals entered its 45th annual national event which makes it the fourth oldest active event on the NHRA Professional tour, behind the Winternationals, U.S. Nationals, and the NHRA Finals. The event was sponsored by Amalie Oil Company, the current sponsor of the race. Previous sponsors of this event include MAC tools. 

The COVID-19 pandemic in 2020 caused some sportsman races to be held behind closed doors.  However, the national event and top sportsman classes were postponed to September with spectators.  The ongoing pandemic has moved the 2021 race to becoming the season opening race for all classes.

Winners

Notes

References

External links
Track website

Drag racing events
TBC Corporation
Sports in Gainesville, Florida
1970 establishments in Florida
Recurring sporting events established in 1970
National Hot Rod Association